Michael Moon is an American literary academic. He received his B.A. from Columbia University and Ph.D. in 1989 from Johns Hopkins University for the thesis Whitman in revision: the politics of corporeality and textuality in the first four editions of Leaves of grass   He has been a professor in the English department at Johns Hopkins University, in Baltimore, United States. He currently works in Women's, Gender and Sexuality Studies at Emory University. He previously taught at Duke University. His primary research focuses on late-nineteenth- and early-twentieth-century American literature and culture, including film, especially in relation to the history and theory of sexuality and of mass culture.  He regularly teaches across a broad historical and theoretical range; graduate seminars in recent years have included "Nature and its Others", "Serial Practices, Serial Forms", and "Contesting the Culture Concept: Pragmatism, Ethnography, Early Film."

He is mentioned by Eve Kosofsky Sedgwick in her memoir, A Dialogue on Love (2000), where she names him as a close friend and current living companion. He is the editor of the Norton Critical Edition of Leaves of Grass and several essay-collections in the fields of Queer Theory and American Studies.

Publications

Books
A Small Boy and Others: Imitation and Initiation in American Culture from Henry James to Andy Warhol (1998)
Disseminating Whitman (Harvard University Press, 1991)
Darger's Resources (Duke University Press, 2012)
Pasolini's Arabian Nights (Arsenal Pulp Press, 2016)

References

Living people
American academics of English literature
American literary critics
Duke University faculty
Johns Hopkins University faculty
Year of birth missing (living people)

Columbia University School of General Studies alumni
Johns Hopkins University alumni
Emory University faculty